The 2019 Open Castilla y León was a professional tennis tournament played on outdoor hard courts. It was the 34th edition, for men, and 5th edition, for women, of the tournament and part of the 2019 ATP Challenger Tour and the 2019 ITF Women's World Tennis Tour. It took place in El Espinar, Segovia, Spain, between 29 July – 4 August 2019.

Men's singles main draw entrants

Seeds 

 1 Rankings as of 22 July 2019.

Other entrants 
The following players received wildcards into the singles main draw:
  Nicolás Álvarez Varona
  Íñigo Cervantes
  Miguel Damas
  Mario González Fernández
  Digvijaypratap Singh

The following player received entry into the singles main draw using a protected ranking:
  Nicolás Barrientos

The following players received entry into the singles main draw using their ITF World Tennis Ranking:
  Markus Eriksson
  Konstantin Kravchuk
  Orlando Luz
  Felipe Meligeni Alves
  Botic van de Zandschulp

The following players received entry from the qualifying draw:
  Fred Gil
  Walter Trusendi

Women's singles main draw entrants

Seeds 

 1 Rankings as of 22 July 2019.

Other entrants 
The following players received wildcards into the singles main draw:
  Ángela Díez Plágaro
  Ángeles Moreno Barranquero
  Olga Parres Azcoitia
  Raquel Villán Pereira

The following players received entry into the singles main draw using their ITF World Tennis Ranking:
  Alba Carrillo Marín
  Dia Evtimova
  Daria Mishina
  Júlia Payola

The following players received entry from the qualifying draw:
  Ainhoa Atucha Gómez
  Lucía Cortez Llorca
  Julieta Lara Estable
  Feng Shuo
  Eugenia Ganga
  Almudena Sanz Llaneza Fernández

Champions

Men's singles

 Nicola Kuhn def.  Pavel Kotov 6–2, 7–6(7–4).

Women's singles
 Arantxa Rus def.  Julia Terziyska, 6–4, 6–1

Men's doubles

 Sander Arends /  David Pel def.  Orlando Luz /  Felipe Meligeni Alves 6–4, 7–6(7–3).

Women's doubles
 Marina Bassols Ribera /  Feng Shuo def.  Alexandra Bozovic /  Shalimar Talbi, 7–5, 7–6(7–4)

References

2019 ITF Women's World Tennis Tour
Open Castilla y León
2019 in Spanish tennis
July 2019 sports events in Spain
August 2019 sports events in Spain
2019
2019 Open Castilla y León